The sixth and final series of Ross Kemp: Extreme World began airing on 21 February 2017 and consists of six 60 minute episodes. The show was not renewed after this series.

Episodes

References

Ross Kemp: Extreme World
2017 British television seasons